Sharon Jean Marshall (born 21 September 1971) is a British entertainment journalist and screenwriter best known for being the resident "Soap Expert" on ITV's This Morning.

Television career
In 2006, Marshall appeared as a contestant on ITV's Celebrity Fit Club and Five's, Trust Me – I'm a Beauty Therapist. She is also recognisable from appearances as talking heads in many celebrity-based documentaries and as a guest panellist on Loose Women in 2007. She has made other television appearances on EastEnders Revealed, Big Brother's Big Mouth and the British Soap Awards.

Writing
Marshall worked on Fleet Street for 10 years and was the TV editor of the News of the World. She used to contribute a weekly column No Sex in the City to The Sun. Marshall is co-author of The Naughty Girl's Guide to Life with Tara Palmer-Tomkinson, which was published by Sphere on 20 September 2007. She has also written episodes for soaps EastEnders and Emmerdale on occasions. As of June 2013, she has written seven episodes of EastEnders, one of which featured the return of Sharon Watts. In 2010 Sharon released her book "Tabloid Girl", memoirs of her 10 years as a tabloid reporter.

Personal life
Marshall lives in West London with marketing executive Paul Fletcher and rescue dog Lily.

Sharon announced on This Morning on 16 January 2018 that she was 14 weeks pregnant. She gave birth to her first child, daughter Betsey Fletcher, on 10 July 2018.

References

External links

Sharon Marshall Unreality TV

1971 births
Living people
British television presenters
English soap opera writers